Servetto is a surname. Notable people with the surname include:

 Nicolás Servetto (born 1957), Argentine professional footballer
 Mara Servetto (born 1957), Italian architect and designer

See also 

 Servo
 Servette (disambiguation)

Italian-language surnames